My Friend from Faro is 2008 German drama film. It marks the directorial debut of Nana Neul and stars Anjorka Strechel and Lucie Hollmann. The film premiered on 16 January 2008 at the Max Ophüls Festival, and was awarded the Fritz Raff Screenplay Award.

Plot 
Mel, an androgynous teenage tomboy in a dead end job, is obsessed with everything Portuguese. When she meets Jenny, Mel quickly decides that the only way to build a relationship with her is by assuming the alter ego of a Portuguese boy.

Cast 
 Anjorka Strechel 	-  Mel Wandel
 Lucie Hollmann    -  Jenny Schmidt
 Manuel Cortez     -  Nuno
 Florian Panzner   -  Knut Wandel
 Tilo Prückner     -  Willi Wandel
 Isolda Dychauk    -  Bianca

References

Further reading

External links 
 
 
  My Friend from Faro (Mein Freund aus Faro)  at BBFC
  My Friend from Faro at Cineuropa
  Mein Freund aus Faro at Lumiere

2008 films
2008 LGBT-related films
German romantic drama films
2000s German-language films
German LGBT-related films
Lesbian-related films
LGBT-related romantic drama films
2008 romantic drama films
2000s German films